Notipekago may refer to:

Not-A-Pe-Ka-Gon Site
Mason County, Michigan, named Notipekago County from 1840 to 1843